Iuliana Gorea-Costin (born November 28, 1957) is a diplomat and politician from the Republic of Moldova. She is a philologist and lawyer by education and served as the first Permanent Representative of Moldova to the Council of Europe and the first director of the "Mircea Eliade" Romanian-English High School in Chişinău. She ran as an independent candidate in Moldovan presidential election, 1996. and Chișinău election, 2005.

Between 1990-1996, she published in Literatura şi Arta, Mesagerul, Femeia Moldovei, Glasul Naţiunii, Ţara, Astra, Luminătorul, Pro Vatra, Generația etc.

Iuliana Gorea-Costin was married to Nicolae Costin (a former mayor of Chişinău)

References

External links 
 VIP Magazin, VIP Magazin, 2006 - "Iuliana Gorea-Costin. Femeia lumină"

1957 births
Living people
People from Ungheni District
Moldovan diplomats
Moldovan politicians